Nick Wammes (born October 21, 1999) is a Canadian track cyclist competing in the sprint events.

Career
At the 2019 Pan American Games in Lima, Peru, Wammes finished in ninth place in the individual sprint event.

In July 2020, Wammes was named to Canada's 2020 Olympic team in the individual sprint and keirin events.

References

1999 births
Canadian male cyclists
Living people
Sportspeople from London, Ontario
Cyclists at the 2019 Pan American Games
Pan American Games competitors for Canada
Cyclists at the 2020 Summer Olympics
Olympic cyclists of Canada
Cyclists at the 2022 Commonwealth Games
Commonwealth Games competitors for Canada
21st-century Canadian people